Joseph Dominick Tarsia (September 23, 1934 – November 1, 2022) was an American recording studio owner and engineer from Philadelphia who was credited on many classic pop music tracks, earning him over 150 gold and platinum record awards. He was the founder and owner of the Sigma Sound Studios, which was the recording base of Gamble and Huff's Philadelphia International Records. Tarsia's recordings between the 1960s and 1980s were noteworthy for their clarity and aural definition, achieved years before the digital era.

Biography
Tarsia took technical courses in high school before taking a position with the research department of Philco Corporation, which lasted for a decade. Later, he became a service technician for various Philadelphia recording studios. He traveled to New York City to mix with top audio engineers. Around 1961, he took an audio engineering position with Cameo Parkway Records. Cameo Parkway's artists included Chubby Checker, Bobby Rydell, The Orlons, The Tymes, Dee Dee Sharp, The Dovells and Bunny Sigler.  Tarsia became the record label's chief engineer.

In the fall of 1967, Tarsia sold his car, house and other personal possessions, purchased a lease on the second floor of the 212 North 12th Street Building (formerly Reco-Art Studios, Emil Korsen, Owner, Engineer), and upgraded the studio equipment from 2-track to 8-track. Operating as a one-man operation, Sigma Sound opened its doors for business on August 5, 1968. During the 1970s' gold and multi-platinum-laced heyday of 'The Sound Of Philadelphia', the facility became a 24-hour operation, in order to meet the great demand for its services.   Sigma won awards for recordings by Jerry Butler, Harold Melvin and the Blue Notes, the O'Jays, the Stylistics, and many others, and musicians who recorded there also included Stevie Wonder, B.B. King, David Bowie, and the Four Tops.

The Philadelphia studio's success prompted Tarsia to open, in 1976, three studios in New York, named Sigma Sound Studios of New York.  Their client list included Whitney Houston, Madonna, Billy Joel, Steely Dan, Ashford and Simpson and Paul Simon.

In 1990, Tarsia's son Michael Tarsia became president of Sigma.   Later, Joe Tarsia became a lecturer and participant in educational programs including GRAMMY In The Schools.

Tarsia closed the New York studio in the early 1990s and sold the original Philadelphia studio in 2003.

Tarsia won many awards for his activities.  He founded and chaired the Society of Professional Audio Recording Services (SPARS), and was a trustee of the National Academy of Recording Arts and Sciences.  In 2016, he was inducted into the Musicians Hall of Fame and Museum.

Tarsia died on November 1, 2022, at the age of 88.

References

External links
  Four-part video interview with Joe Tarsia, Open Vault, 1995
 
 

1934 births
2022 deaths
Musicians from Philadelphia